This Modern Age is a 1931 American pre-Code Metro-Goldwyn-Mayer feature film directed by Nick Grinde and starring Joan Crawford, Neil Hamilton, Pauline Frederick and Albert Conti.

Plot
Socialite Valentine "Val" Winters (Joan Crawford) is a child of divorced parents and has not seen her sophisticate mother, Diane, (Pauline Frederick), in years. Indeed, Diane had all but forgotten about Val, as the courts awarded sole custody of Val to her father, who had recently died.  Val travels to Paris for a reunion where her mother is living as the mistress of André de Graignon (Albert Conti).

While in Paris, Valentine meets fun-loving and alcoholic Tony (Monroe Owsley), who is in Diane's social circle.  When Valentine and Tony are involved in a car wreck, they are rescued from his overturned car by football-playing Harvardian Bob Blake Jr. (Neil Hamilton).  Bob and Valentine fall in love, and, when he invites his parents (Hobart Bosworth and Emma Dunn) to meet her, everything goes wrong as they do not approve of Tony and his boisterous friends or of Diane's living arrangement with Andre.

Later, Bob overhears a conversation between Diane and André de Graignon during which André complains about his life being on hold for Val and that he is kicking Diane out of his house.  Bob tries to rush their marriage plans so that he can take her away from her mother's deception without Val discovering the truth, but when she resists, he tells her the truth about her mother and implores her to forget about her and her friends and abscond with him. Insulted, Val says the allegations about the house not being Diane's are a lie and that she loves her mother over anything, and then she spurns Bob.

Val goes to her mother, and when Diane becomes alarmed that Val may have put her relationship with the wealthy Bob in jeopardy, Diane tells her the truth.  Val is a bit shocked, but is determined to stay with her mother no matter the consequences.  The two move into a much smaller apartment, and Tony comes by because he is still smitten with Val.  However, unbeknownst to Val, Diane recontacted André and told him that she would leave Val to travel Europe with him.  Diane gives the news of her impending departure to her daughter, who is heartbroken at her mother's betrayal.

Diane leaves and visits Bob for a final time.  She tells him that she went to his parents to beg for mercy for Val's sake.  They reject Diane's entreaties.  Having done this, Diane's reputation in Paris is ruined, which is why she took the opportunity to go away with André. Suddenly, Bob views his parents attitude of condemning Val for her mother's sins as antiquated and shameful, and the two embrace.  Bob goes to Val and they are reunited to continue their relationship.

Cast
Joan Crawford - Valentine Winters
Pauline Frederick - Diane Winters
Neil Hamilton - Bob Blake
Monroe Owsley - Tony Girard
Hobart Bosworth - Mr. Robert Blake Sr.
Emma Dunn - Mrs. Margaret Blake
Albert Conti - André de Graignon
Adrienne D'Ambricourt - Marie (the housekeeper)
Marcelle Corday - Alyce (the maid)

Production
The film was based upon the story Girls Together by Mildred Cram, and follows the story of a socialite girl deciding between the social sins of her mother and a comfortable life in the arms of a rich suitor.

This Modern Age is notable also for Crawford playing a blonde. According to a biography, she "wore her hair that color because the actress who was originally to play the part of the mother, Marjorie Rambeau (who'd played her mother in Laughing Sinners), was a blonde. When Rambeau became ill, the part was recast with a brunette actress, Pauline Frederick, whom Joan greatly admired. Joan's scenes had already been shot, and the difference in hair color was not reason enough to reshoot them. Besides, there was no reason why a brunette mother couldn't have a blonde-haired daughter - or maybe she was just into peroxide."

Reception

Critical reception
Mordaunt Hall in The New York Times commented, "The film glides along merrily most of the time, but now and again it has its off moments...Nicholas Grinde, [the director] has done splendid work by his comedy, but his serious interludes might have been handled more effectively." The New York Times also said of Crawford, "she gives a better portrayal here than she has in any of her previous talking pictures...she succeeds in being quite convincing in cheery and serious moments."

Box office
According to MGM records the film earned $708,000 in the US and Canada and $183,000 elsewhere resulting in a profit of $218,000.

References

External links
 
 
 

1931 films
1931 drama films
1930s English-language films
American black-and-white films
Metro-Goldwyn-Mayer films
Films directed by Nick Grinde
American drama films
Films based on works by Mildred Cram
1930s American films